Union Royale La Louvière Centre is a Belgian association football club created in 1922.

History 
In 2011, it moved from Stade Raymond Dienne, Haine-Saint-Pierre to Stade du Tivoli, La Louvière as R.A.A. Louviéroise went into liquidation in 2009.

The team was originally known as Union Royale Sportive du Centre or URS Centre but this was changed to the current name in 2011. It is playing in the third division A since 2008–09. The club is based in La Louvière in the Centre area. Due to the competition reform of 2016, the club began competing in the new Belgian Second Amateur Division, where the club finished fourth in the first season. In 2017, Racing Charleroi Couillet Fleurus took on the name RAAL La Louvière and moved to the city in order to restore the former glory of the defunct R.A.A. Louviéroise.

In the 2018–19 season, the club won the title of the Walloon division of the Second Amateur Division, which meant that it they won promotion to the third-tier Belgian First Amateur Division. Due to the COVID-19 pandemic, the competition was canceled after 24 matchdays. At that time, the club was in fourteenth place, which meant that they would be relegated to Second Amateur Division. However, in the end, there were several professional clubs that did not receive a licence for professional football and had to relegate to the Belgian Second Amateur Division, and thus the club remained in the third tier.

The club changed their logo in May 2020, and the bird and crown became dark blue instead of green. It was decided in May 2020 to change the club name to La Louvière Centre, thereby eliminating the addition "Union Royale". According to the board, the letters "URLC" had become synonymous its negative past of financial struggles.

Current squad

References

External links 
Official website

Football clubs in Belgium
Sport in La Louvière